Cainbable is a rural locality in the Scenic Rim Region, Queensland, Australia.

Geography 
The locality is a long north-south the valley formed around Cainbable Creek, which rises in O'Reilly to the south and then flows north through Cainbable exiting to the north (Nindooinbah) where it becomes a tributary of the Albert River.

A small area in the south of the locality forms part of the Lamington National Park which extends through neighbouring O'Reilly and Sarabah and areas beyond. Apart from the protected area, the land use is almost entirely grazing on native vegetation with small areas of irrigated pastures and irrigated crop growing in the north of the locality around the creek.

History

In the  Cainbable had a population of 74 people. The locality contained 36 households, in which 50.7% of the population were males and 49.3% of the population were females with a median age of 49, 11 years above the national average. The average weekly household income was $1,375, $63 below the national average.

Education 
There are no schools in Cainbable. The nearest government primary schools are Darlington State School in Darlington to the south-west and Canungra State School in Canungra to the north-east. The nearest government secondary schools are Beaudesert State High School in Beaudesert to the north-west and Tamborine Mountain State High School in Tamborine Mountain to the north-east.

Attractions 
The locality's elevated terrain provides many opportunities for excellent vistas along Duck Creek Road, from north to south:

 Jean and Tom Lookout
Barram's Outlook
Rics Lookout
Tom's Lookout
Father Busser of St Mary's Lookout
Sister Catharina's Bend 
Jackies Rest
Hugh's Haven
 Rogers Corner
Lookout for Fr Canzer
Shepards Lookout
 Kerry Lookout
 Kurrajong Lookout

References 

Scenic Rim Region
Localities in Queensland